Man-Shield is a privately owned Canadian construction company founded in Winnipeg, Manitoba in 1972, with 2007 sales volume of CDN$93,818,121. A 2008 dispute between Man-Shield, and Zephyr, a property owner-developer, set important precedents in interpreting the Canadian Builders’ Lien Act. In December 2008 a consortium led by Man-Shield won a  contract for redevelopment of the Thunder Bay waterfront. That contract has since been lost.

References

External links

Construction and civil engineering companies of Canada
Canadian companies established in 1972
Construction and civil engineering companies established in 1972